The 1951–52 season was Manchester City's 50th season of competitive football and 35th season in the top division of English football. In addition to the First Division, the club competed in the FA Cup.

First Division

League table

Results summary

References

External links

Manchester City F.C. seasons